WaterSecure, the trading name of the Queensland Manufactured Water Authority, was a statutory authority of the Government of Queensland that supplied water to the South East Queensland region of Australia through its desalination plant and a water recycling scheme, the Western Corridor Recycled Water scheme. WaterSecure was merged with Seqwater on 1 July 2011.

Function and activities
The Gold Coast Desalination Plant was the first large-scale desalination plant on Australia's eastern seaboard. The plant has the capacity to supply up to 125 megalitres a day of drinking water (45 GL/year). 

The Western Corridor Recycled Water scheme provides purified water to Swanbank Power Station and Tarong Power Station with the capacity to supply industry and agriculture.

See also

 Queensland Water Commission
 Seawater desalination in Australia
 Water security in Australia
 Water supply and sanitation in Australia

References

External links
 Seqwater
 Global Water Awards 2009

Water companies of Queensland
Water management in Queensland
Government agencies of Queensland
South East Queensland